Suki may refer to:

People 
 Suki (Low Sook Yee) (born 1989), Malaysian singer, winner of the reality TV series One in a Million
 Suki Brownsdon (born 1965), British swimmer
 Suki Chan (born 1977), Hong Kong artist
 Suki Chui (born 1984), Hong Kong actress and Miss Hong Kong participant
 Suki Goodwin, actress who appeared in Hell Night
 , actress, married to actor Jonathan Scarfe
 Suki Kim (born 1970), Korean American writer, author of The Interpreter
 Suki Kwan, Hong Kong actress who appeared in Drunken Master II and other films
 Suki Lahav (born 1951), Israeli violinist, vocalist, actress, lyricist, screenwriter, and novelist
 Suki Manabe (born 1931), Japanese meteorologist and climatologist
 Suki Potier (1946–1981), English model
 Suki Sommer (Susan T. Sommer) (1935–2008), American music librarian, teacher, editor, and music critic
 Suki Schorer (born 1939), American ballet dancer, ballet mistress, teacher, and writer
 Suki Sivam, Tamil scholar, novelist, and TV host
 Suki Seokyeong Kang (born 1977), South Korean multimedia artist
 Suki Waterhouse (born 1992), English model and actress
 Suki Webster, improv performer and co-writer of Paul Merton's Birth of Hollywood

Characters 
 Suki (Avatar: The Last Airbender), the leader of the exclusively female Kyoshi Warriors, a sect established by the Avatar incarnation of the same name
 Suki Yaki, in the 1966 film What's Up, Tiger Lily?
 Suki Panesar, from the BBC soap opera EastEnders
 Sookie Stackhouse, in novels and the TV series True Blood
 Sookie St. James, in the TV series Gilmore Girls, played by Melissa McCarthy
 Suky Tawdry, in The Beggar's Opera and The Threepenny Opera
 The Groovy Girls doll line by Manhattan Toy features a doll named Suki
 Suki, an Alaskan malamute dog on the PBS children's program Molly of Denali
 Suki, in the 2003 American film 2 Fast 2 Furious

 Sukie Ridgemont, character in John Updike's novel The Witches of Eastwick, played by Michelle Pfieffer in the 1987 film

Places 
 Suki, Miyazaki, a village in Nishimorokata District, Miyazaki, Japan
 Suki, Papua New Guinea, a  city in Western Province, Papua New Guinea
 Suki Airport, an airport in Suki, Papua New Guinea
 Suki Dam, an earthfill dam on Suki river near Khiroda, Maharashtra, India
 Suki-ye Olya, a village in Lorestan Province, Iran

Other uses 
 Suki language, a language of Papua New Guinea
 "Suki" (song), a 1994 song by Dreams Come True
 Suki: A Like Story, a 1999 manga by CLAMP
 Thai suki, a Thai a communal dish where diners dip food into a pot of broth

See also 
 Tsuki, the Japanese word for "thrust", used in martial arts
 AnimeSuki, a website that focuses on providing unlicensed anime fansubs
 Sukiyaki (disambiguation)
 Sukie (disambiguation)
 Sookie